Lolette Payot-Dodille (17 April 1910 – February 1988) was a Swiss-French tennis player.

Biography 
Payot was born on 17 April 1910 at Lausanne. She learned to play tennis age 8 on the courts of the Montchoisi tennis club. At the age of 13, she won the Swiss national championships for the first time.

Payot competed at the Wimbledon Championships from 1929 to 1935, reaching the singles quarterfinals in 1931, 1933 and 1934. At the French Championships, she reached the quarterfinals in 1932, 1934 and 1935. In 1935, she won the mixed doubles title partnering Marcel Bernard at Paris. She was ranked world number 4 by A. Wallis Myers in 1932.

In August 1932 she won the singles title at the German Championships in Hamburg after a three-sets victory in the final against Hilde Krahwinkel.

Payot won the Swiss national championships seven times in a row from 1929 to 1935. During the Swiss championships in July 1935, Payot fell seriously ill. It took her a year to recover, and she decided to retire from the amateur tennis circuit. She then opened a tennis school and worked as a coach at Montchoisi. In January 1937, she married French  Robert Dodille at Lausanne and took French citizenship.

By 1943, Payot had begun to play tournaments again.  In August 1945, she won the singles title at the French championships. The title, however, isn't recognized by the Fédération Française de Tennis and the International Tennis Federation.

Payot continued to work as a coach and as a secretary at Montchoisi tennis club until 1982. She died at an age of 77 in February 1988.

Tournament titles

Doubles

Mixed doubles

References 

1910 births
1988 deaths
French Championships (tennis) champions
Swiss female tennis players
French female tennis players
Grand Slam (tennis) champions in mixed doubles
Date of death missing
Sportspeople from Lausanne
20th-century French women